Juan Luis Lillo Jara (born 11 July 1983), also known as Juan Luis in Indonesia, is a Chilean former professional footballer who played as a midfielder for clubs in Chile, Thailand and Indonesia.

Career
Born in Santiago, Lillo played in his homeland for Cobreloa in the top division.

Abroad, he played in Indonesia for Persigo Gorontalo, PSPS Pekanbaru, Persema Malang and Persipon Pontianak. 

He also had a stint in Thailand with Chainat.

Personal life
Lillo was married to the Indonesian TV presenter and model , with whom he had legal issues due to alleged domestic violence.

References

External links
 Juan Luis Lillo at ZeroZero.pt 
 
 

1983 births
Living people
Footballers from Santiago
Chilean footballers
Chilean expatriate footballers
Association football midfielders
Cobreloa footballers
Persigo Gorontalo players
PSPS Pekanbaru players
Persema Malang players
Juan Luis Lillo
Chilean Primera División players
Indonesian Premier Division players
Juan Luis Lillo
Chilean expatriate sportspeople in Indonesia
Chilean expatriate sportspeople in Thailand
Expatriate footballers in Indonesia
Expatriate footballers in Thailand